Political ReviewNet is an online database of book reviews from academic journals in the field of international relations and political sciences.

Academic journals that participate 
Australian Journal of Politics & History.
Australian Journal of Public Administration (IPAA).
Constellations.
Diplomatic History (SHAFA).
International Affairs (RIIA).
International Studies Review (ISA).
Journal of Common Market Studies (UACES).
Journal of Contingencies and Crisis Management.
Journal of Politics (SPSA).
Middle East Policy.
Nations and Nationalism.
Peace and Change.
Political Quarterly.
Political Studies (PSA).
Public Administration Review (ASPA).
Governance and Public Administration.

External links

Political science journals
Political science
International relations journals
Books about international relations
Political databases